Speakerboxxx/The Love Below is the fifth studio album by American hip hop duo Outkast. It was released on September 23, 2003, by Arista Records. Issued as a double album, its length of over two hours is spread across solo albums from both of the group's members. Big Boi's Speakerboxxx is a Southern hip hop album with a P-Funk influence, while André 3000's The Love Below features psychedelic, pop, funk, electro, and jazz styles.

Speakerboxxx/The Love Below was supported with the hit singles "Hey Ya!" and "The Way You Move", which both reached  1 on the US Billboard Hot 100, and the top-10 hit "Roses". The album debuted at No. 1 on the Billboard 200 with sales of 510,000 copies in its first week. It eventually amassed a total of seven non-consecutive weeks at the top of the chart and 24 weeks in the Top 10. It has been certified diamond and 11 times platinum by the RIAA (each disc in the double album counted as a separate unit for certification). As of March 2012, it has sold 5.7 million units in the United States.

Speakerboxxx/The Love Below received widespread acclaim from music critics, who praised the consistency of Big Boi's Speakerboxxx and the eclectic musical style of André 3000's The Love Below. It topped The Village Voices Pazz & Jop critics poll, and won Album of the Year and Best Rap Album at the 46th Grammy Awards, while "Hey Ya!" won Best Urban/Alternative Performance. The album has been acclaimed as one of the greatest albums of the 2000s and was ranked 290th in Rolling Stone’s 2020 edition of their 500 Greatest Albums of All Time list.

Background
Following the release of Outkast's fourth studio album Stankonia (2000), André 3000 felt urged to do something different from his previous projects and moved to Los Angeles to pursue an acting career. He was relatively unsuccessful, landing a minor role in Hollywood Homicide (2003) and a one-episode appearance in the drama series The Shield. He returned to music and recorded a solo album that was different from the material he had recorded as part of Outkast. The output was a blend of pop, jazz and funk with live instruments and singing instead of rapping. When writing songs, he used a microcassette recorder in order to "record melodic ideas and lyrics, then build the melody around the lyrics".

The CD artwork is designed so that the Speakerboxxx artwork is on the front of the case, whereas the Love Below artwork is on the back of the case. These images are merged on the artwork displayed on online stores (Front cover on left, back cover on right). The CD booklet and the credits printed within is also divided in half and the back cover is printed on both sides, allowing fans to customize who appears on both the front and back covers.

Recording
The recording of The Love Below began at André 3000's Los Angeles home, using Pro Tools software, in addition to a drum machine, keyboards and various synthesizers. He enjoyed the atmosphere of recording at home instead of a studio, saying to XXL, "it didn't start in the studio because if you have a bunch of people around, they're coming from the party and I'm in there singing falsetto ... those vibes didn't match." His initial sessions were hampered by his inexperience with Pro Tools and, unaware how to edit his recordings, he opted to record songs such as "Pink & Blue" in their entirety. Other gear used included an Avalon VT737 SP and AD2055 EQ and AD2044 compressors for his vocals. After creating five songs, he informed Big Boi of the solo project he had been working on.

Big Boi had already recorded some songs when André 3000 had contacted him, but after their conversation he decided his next project would be Speakerboxxx. Describing his approach in the studio, Big Boi later commented to XXL, "the idea was just to keep it funky, keep it jamming, it's always bass-heavy. And lyricism, it's all about lyrics, taking pride in your pen and your pad." His favorite song to record was "Unhappy". He spent several days working on its hook before driving to his mother's home and playing the song in her driveway, to which she responded enthusiastically. At some point in the recording, the project moved to OutKast's Stankonia Studios in downtown Atlanta, which had been used to record OutKast's previous release and namesake. John Frye, the studio manager and an engineer, would later recognise that much of the media attention surrounding the album's recording was concerned with André 3000 and Big Boi's working relationship and why they had chosen to record separately. He concedes that both enjoyed working solo and were doing so more frequently, but they continued to share and critique each other's music.

John Frye also describes how the format of the projects changed rapidly. Initially intended as two separate solo releases, they decided to merge their work and create a soundtrack album as André 3000 had initially intended. The duo then began preparing to work on a motion picture, but reconsidered and compromised by interpolating background noise into songs, such as the slamming of car doors and footsteps. They eventually settled on releasing a double album. Frye noted the end of the recording sessions as particularly stressful for André 3000, who he described as drained from working at four studios simultaneously. In total, an estimated 120 songs were recorded for Speakerboxxx/The Love Below.

Music and lyrics
Speakerboxxx/The Love Below is a two-disc set that features 39 tracks, including several interludes and a postlude. It is a concept album with the intention of each disc delivering each member's individual perspective and sound. The Love Below is substantially longer than Big Boi's Speakerboxxx, clocking in at almost 78 minutes, compared to 56 minutes for Speakerboxxx. Featured guests on Speakerboxxx include Sleepy Brown, Jazze Pha, Jay-Z, CeeLo Green, Killer Mike, Goodie Mob, Lil Jon and Ludacris. Guests on The Love Below include Rosario Dawson, Norah Jones, Kelis, and Fonzworth Bentley.

According to music journalist Roni Sarig, Speakerboxxx features Southern hip hop with more social awareness than The Love Below, exploring themes of family, philosophy, religion, politics and "a wider emotional terrain ... from melancholy to outrage to expression."

By contrast, The Love Below is identified by Sarig as showcasing "jazzy pop-funk" comparable to the music of Prince. Marcello Carlin of Uncut magazine calls it "an avant-soul concept album". The disc's abounding theme is love, examining the emotions one experiences when falling in love and loving oneself. Sarig suggests that André 3000's break-up with neo soul singer Erykah Badu had influenced much of the lyrical content on the album, which he sees as concerned with the search for true love.

Critical reception

Speakerboxxx/The Love Below was met with widespread critical acclaim. At Metacritic, which assigns a normalized rating out of 100 to reviews from mainstream publications, the album received an average score of 91, based on 26 reviews.

Reviewing for AllMusic, Stephen Thomas Erlewine called both discs "visionary, imaginative listens, providing some of the best music of 2003, regardless of genre". Will Hermes wrote in Entertainment Weekly that the album's "ambition flies so far beyond that of anyone doing rap right now (or pop, or rock, or R&B)". Blender magazine's Kris Ex felt that it "holds an explosion of creativity that couldn't have been contained in just one LP". The Guardians Dorian Lynskey described both discs as "sublime ... hip-hop's Sign o' the Times or The White Album: a career-defining masterpiece of breathtaking ambition". According to Andy Gill of The Independent, the album set "a new benchmark not just for hip hop, but for pop in general", featuring "so many musical tributaries coursing into both Big Boi's progressive-rap pyrotechnics and Dre's freaky jazz-funk love odyssey that even their old tag of 'psychedelic hip-hop soul' starts to look restrictive". Stylus Magazines Nick Southall called it "a series of spectacular moments and memorable events". NME magazine's John Mulvey described its two discs as "two Technicolor explosions of creativity that people will be exploring, analysing and partying to for years". Sal Cinquemani from Slant Magazine wrote that it is "greater than the sum of its parts, and this kind of expertly crafted pop and deftly executed funk rarely happen at the same time—not since Stankonia, at least."

Less enthusiastic were Rolling Stone magazine's Jon Caramanica, particularly about André 3000 expressing his "right to be peculiar in a hip-hop context", and Pitchforks Brent DiCrescenzo, who said The Love Below does not sustain "consistent brilliance and emotional complexity throughout" like Speakerboxxx. In The Village Voice, Robert Christgau said the double album could have been "the classic P-Funk rip it ain't quite" had Speakerboxxx alone been issued with "Roses", "Spread", "Hey Ya!", and "an oddity of [André 3000's] choosing". He nonetheless commended what he described as "commercial ebullience, creative confidence, and wretched excess, blessed excess, impressive excess". In The Rolling Stone Album Guide (2004), Roni Sarig wrote that, "for sheer breadth, ambition, and musical vision, there's little doubt Speakerboxxx/The Love Below is a classic."

Accolades
Speakerboxxx/The Love Below was voted as the best album of the year in The Village Voices Pazz & Jop critics poll. In Australia, "Hey Ya!" was voted No. 2 on the 2003 Triple J Hottest 100, the country's biggest alternative music poll of its type. The album was nominated for six Grammy Awards, winning three (Album of the Year, Best Urban/Alternative Performance for "Hey Ya!" and Best Rap Album). OutKast's other nominations were for Producer of the Year, Best Short-Form Music Video, and Record of the Year, the latter two both for "Hey Ya!".

In 2009, NME ranked Speakerboxxx/The Love Below No. 44 on its list of the top 100 greatest albums of the decade, while Newsweek ranked the album No. 1 on its list of the ten best albums of the decade.

The jazz periodical Down Beat chose it as the best "beyond" album. In 2012 Complex named the album one of the classic albums of the last decade. In 2013, NME ranked Speakerboxxx/The Love Below at No. 183 on their list of the 500 greatest albums of all time.  The album was also included in the book 1001 Albums You Must Hear Before You Die. In Rolling Stone's Top 500 Albums of All-Time, it was ranked No. 290 in the 2020 edition.

Commercial performance
After having had three No. 2 albums on the US Billboard 200, OutKast enjoyed their first chart-topping album with Speakerboxxx/The Love Below. The album debuted at No. 1 during the week of October 11, 2003, selling more than 510,000 copies in its first week. It became the second-biggest debut for a double album during the SoundScan-era (beginning in 1991). The album sold 235,000 copies in its second week, holding its position atop the Billboard chart. Speakerboxxx/The Love Below spent the next three weeks in the top 5 before returning to the top spot for one more week. Sales remained strong, and the album would spend another four weeks at No. 1 between January and February 2004. In all, Speakerboxxx/The Love Below amassed a total of seven weeks at No. 1, 24 weeks in the Top 10, and 56 weeks on the Billboard 200. Speakerboxxx/The Love Below has been certified diamond and 11 times platinum by the Recording Industry Association of America for shipping more than 11 million units (in this case, 5.5 million double album sets, which are double-counted by the RIAA).

The single "Hey Ya!" went to No. 1 on the Billboard Hot 100 in the United States, topping the charts there for nine weeks. It was the act's second No. 1 single, following 2000's "Ms. Jackson". "Hey Ya!" also topped the singles charts in Canada and Australia and charted in 28 countries around the world. "Hey Ya!" was also the first platinum download on iTunes. Follow-up single "The Way You Move" knocked "Hey Ya!" off the top of the charts in the US in February 2004, just the seventh time a recording act replaced itself at No. 1. "The Way You Move" topped the singles chart for one week. The third single released from the album was "Roses" from The Love Below, which reached No. 9. The fourth and fifth singles released, "Prototype (The Love Below)" and "GhettoMusick (Speakerboxxx)", did not chart.

Track listing

All tracks are written by André Benjamin, except where noted. All tracks produced by André 3000, except "Roses" produced by Dojo5 and André 3000.

Notes
  signifies a co-producer
 Shortly after the Grammy winnings, pressings of The Love Below contained a slightly altered track list. The song "My Favorite Things", which was originally a hidden track, became credited on the album's track listing. Secondly, a 21-second interlude performed by André 3000 and Amanda Qasha Aman was placed before "My Favorite Things", entitled "The Letter". To compensate for the addition of "The Letter", the ending of "A Life in the Day of Benjamin André (Incomplete)" was changed, replacing the radio interview with a slightly longer fade out, shortening the track's running time by 20 seconds. Additionally, a 6-second spoken outro was added to "Vibrate". The revised version of the album is the one that is currently available through digital media outlets.
 "Ghetto Musick" and "Knowing" are the only tracks on Speakerboxxx to feature André 3000, while "Roses" is the only track on The Love Below to feature Big Boi.
 "Bowtie", "Rooster", "Take Off Your Cool", "Church", "She Lives In My Lap" and "Vibrate" are included in the soundtrack of OutKast's film Idlewild. As a result, Speakerboxxx/The Love Below contributes as many songs to the movie's soundtrack as the Idlewild album does.

Sample credits
"Ghetto Musick", from Speakerboxxx, contains samples of "Love, Need and Want You" by Patti LaBelle.
The first few seconds of "Intro" from Speakerboxxx is a sample of the beginning of the song "Europop" from the Eiffel 65 album of the same name.
"She Lives in My Lap", from The Love Below, contains samples of "Mind Playing Tricks on Me" by Geto Boys and "Pistolgrip-Pump" by Volume 10.
"Pink & Blue", from The Love Below, contains samples of "Age Ain't Nothing But a Number" by Aaliyah and "Why Can't We Live Together" by Timmy Thomas.
"My Favorite Things" from The Love Below contains samples from John Coltrane's 1960 recording by the same name.

Personnel
Credits adapted from the album's liner notes.

Speakerboxxx

Big Boi – executive producer, lead vocals (all tracks), producer (tracks 4–7, 11, 14, 16), programming (tracks 4, 7, 11, 13, 15), keyboards (tracks 4, 7, 11, 13), background vocals (track 8)
André 3000 – executive producer, lead vocals (track 2), producer (tracks 2, 9, 18), keyboards (tracks 2, 18), programming (track 18), additional vocals (track 13)
L.A. Reid – executive producer
Bernie Grundman – audio mastering (all tracks)
Killer Mike – lead vocals (tracks 7, 14)
Devine Evans – sound design, engineer
Sleepy Brown – lead vocals (tracks 9, 11), backgrounds vocals (tracks 2, 3, 6, 7, 14), additional vocals (tracks 4, 5)
Konkrete – lead vocals (track 11)
Big Gipp – lead vocals (track 11)
Ludacris – lead vocals (track 11)
Jay Z – lead vocals (track 14)
Khujo Goodie – lead vocals (track 16)
Cee-Lo – lead vocals (track 16)
Mello – lead vocals (track 18)
Slimm Calhoun – lead vocals (track 18)
Cutmaster Swift – producer (track 1), cuts (tracks 6, 14)
Mr. DJ – producer (tracks 3, 8, 13, 14)
Carl Mo – producer (tracks 5, 6)
Jazze Pha – additional vocals (track 4)
Lil Jon & The Eastside Boyz – additional vocals (track 18)
Myrna Crenshaw – background vocals (tracks 2, 7–9)
Joi – background vocals (track 2)
Debra Killings – background vocals (tracks 3, 9, 14, 16), bass (tracks 3–6, 8, 9, 14, 18)
Tori Alamaze – background vocals (track 4)
John Frye – audio recording, audio mixing (all tracks)
Moka Nagatani – audio recording (tracks 2, 4, 13)
Vincent Alexander – audio recording (tracks 5, 11), recording assistant (track 2)
Matt Still – audio recording (track 9)
Chris Carmouche – audio recording (track 11)
Warren Bletcher – recording assistant (all tracks)
Marvin "Chanz" Parkman – keyboards (tracks 3, 8, 9, 14, 16), organ (track 2), piano (track 6)
Kevin Kendrick – keyboards (track 9)
Donnie Mathis – guitar (tracks 3, 6)
David Whild – guitar (tracks 4, 7, 8, 14)
ZaZa – guitar (track 5)
Preston Crump – bass (track 3)
Aaron Mills – bass (track 9)
Victor Alexander – drums (tracks 7, 8)
Hornz Unlimited – horns (tracks 4–6, 18)
Rajinder Kala – congos (track 3)
Regina Davenport – A&R direction and coordination, production coordinator
Theresa Wilson – A&R administrator
Michael "Big Blue" Williams – management
Joe-Mama Nitzberg – creative direction
Jeff Schulz – art direction and design
Jonathan Mannion – photography

The Love Below

André 3000 – executive producer, lead vocals (all tracks), producer (all tracks), programming (tracks 1, 9, 12), keyboards (tracks 1, 9, 12), guitar (tracks 4, 7, 8, 18), tenor saxophone (track 8), acoustic guitar (track 9), background vocals (track 19)
Big Boi – executive producer, lead vocals (track 10; uncredited), background vocals (track 6)
L.A. Reid – executive producer
Brian "Big Bass" Gardner – audio mastering (all tracks)
Kelis – lead vocals (track 15)
Norah Jones – lead vocals (track 18)
Killer Mike – background vocals (track 10)
Sleepy Brown – background vocals (track 19)
Joi – additional vocals (track 4)
Myrna Crenshaw – additional vocals (track 4)
Marianne Lee Stiff – additional vocals (track 7)
John Frisbee – additional vocals (track 7)
Rosario Dawson – additional vocals (track 8)
Rabeka Tunei – additional vocals (track 9), recording assistant (track 9)
John Frye – audio recording (all tracks), audio mixing (tracks 10, 14, 17), pre-mixing (tracks 2–8, 10–13, 15, 18, 19)
Robert "HipHop" Hannon – audio recording (tracks 4, 5, 9)
Pete Novak – audio recording (tracks 4, 5, 9, 10, 12, 14, 15, 17, 19), audio mixing (track 15), pre-mixing (tracks 4, 5, 12)
Matt Still – audio recording (track 7)
Terrence Cash – audio recording (track 8)
Reggie Cozier – audio recording (track 13)
Darrell Thorp – audio recording (track 13)
Brian Paluralski – audio recording (track 15)
Padraic Kernin – audio recording (track 18), recording assistant (track 18)
Neal Pogue – audio mixing (tracks 2, 7–9, 18, 19)
Dexter Simmons – audio mixing (tracks 4, 5, 12, 13)
Warren Bletcher – recording assistant (all tracks)
Josh Monroy – recording assistant (tracks 4, 5, 9)
Russell Buelna – recording assistant (tracks 4, 13, 14, 19), mixing assistant (track 15)
Chris Carmouche – recording assistant (tracks 8, 13)
Jared Robbins – recording assistant (tracks 9, 15), mixing assistant (track 15)
Jeff Moses – recording assistant (tracks 12, 14, 17)
Greg Burns – recording assistant (track 13), mixing assistant (track 13)
Chris Steffen – recording assistant (track 13), mixing assistant (track 13)
Donnie Whittemore – mixing assistant (tracks 4, 12, 13)
Alex Reverberi – mixing assistant (tracks 5, 7, 8, 10, 14, 18, 19)
Malik Albert – mixing assistant (track 8)
Greg Price – mixing assistant (track 9)
Sean Tallman – mixing assistant (track 17)
Kevin Kendrick – keyboards (tracks 2, 5, 7, 9, 10, 14, 19), guitar (track 4), piano (track 17)
Marvin "Chanz" Parkman – keyboards (tracks 8, 19)
Darryl Smith – guitar (track 2)
Tomi Martin – guitar (track 8)
Moffet Morris – upright bass (track 4)
Kevin Brandon – double bass (tracks 4, 14)
Kevin Smith – electric bass (track 5)
Aaron Mills – bass (tracks 7, 8, 17)
Hornz Unlimited – horns (tracks 2, 14, 19), trumpets (tracks 5, 8)
Cutmaster Swift – cuts (tracks 5, 8)
Jef Van Veen – drums (tracks 2, 14)
Benjamin Wright – string arrangement, conductor (track 13)
Charles Veal – violin, concert master (track 13)
James Sitterly – violin (track 13)
Mark Casillas – violin (track 13)
Gina Kranstadt – violin (track 13)
Marisa McClead – violin (track 13)
Mark Cargill – violin (track 13)
Richard Adkins – violin (track 13)
Tibor Zelig – violin (track 13)
Yarda Kettner – violin (track 13)
Louis Kabok – violin (track 13)
Patrick Morgan – viola (track 13)
Robin Ross – viola (track 13)
Michel Vardone – viola (track 13)
March Vaj – viola (track 13)
John Krovaza – cello (track 13)
Martin Smith – cello (track 13)
Lisa Chien – cello (track 13)
Catherine Chan – cello (track 13)
Kelvin Brandon – contra, bass (track 13)
Kevin O'Neal – contra, bass (track 13)
Gary Harris – saxophone (track 17)
Fulton Yard Unlimited – digital editing (track 14)
Regina Davenport – A&R direction and coordination, production coordinator
Theresa Wilson – A&R administrator
Michael "Big Blue" Williams – management
Joe-Mama Nitzberg – creative direction
Jeff Schulz – art direction and design
Torkil Gudnason – photography

Charts

Weekly charts

Year-end charts

Decade-end charts

Certifications

See also
 List of best-selling albums in the United States

Notes

References

External links
 Speakerboxxx/The Love Below at Discogs
 Speakerboxxx/The Love Below at Metacritic
 International chart positions at acharts.us

Outkast albums
2003 albums
Grammy Award for Album of the Year
Grammy Award for Best Rap Album
Arista Records albums
Albums produced by André 3000
Concept albums